Donnybrook is a town situated between Boyanup and Kirup on the South Western Highway,  south of Perth, Western Australia. The town is the centre of apple cultivation in Western Australia. The town is also known for its picturesque abundance of English Oak trees, as well as for the Apple Fun Park, a large outdoor playground in the centre of town.

History
Donnybrook is on the traditional lands of the Noongar people. George Nash and other Europeans arrived here around 1842. They named the place after their home town, Donnybrook, then a suburb of Dublin, Ireland. The eastern part of the town was formerly called Minninup. The western portion of the townsite is currently known as Irishtown. The town of Donnybrook was gazetted in 1894.

In 1897, Richard Hunter discovered gold about 6 kilometres south of the Donnybrook townsite. Hunter eventually sold out to Fred Camilleri (a well known prospector from Kalgoorlie) and Camilleri was able to interest the internationally renowned Polish geologist Modest Maryanski. It was on the basis of Maryanski's report that a new company "Donnybrook Goldfields Ltd" was floated on the London Stock Exchange in 1899.  A mini gold rush occurred, resulting in the Government gazetting the Donnybrook Goldfield - in the process making provision for a new town to be called "Goldtown". From the census of 1901, it was known over 200 gold miners were camped on the goldfields. The excitement was short-lived however, and the Hunters Venture mine closed in August 1903. The area was worked during the Great Depression by locals Laurie and Foster Payne, then re-pegged and explored during the 1980s and again from 2004-5.

Geography

Climate
Donnybrook experiences a Mediterranean climate (Köppen climate classification Csa). Although summers are usually dry, heavy downpours in the summer are not uncommon. Donnybrook gets 93.9 clear days annually.

Industry
Donnybrook is the home of Western Australia's apple industry. In 1900, the first Granny Smith apple tree was planted, and the apple orchard industry grew after World War I.

Apples are harvested between March and May, with apple blossoms prominent in October. Donnybrook's industries also include timber, beef, dairy and viticulture. Many visiting backpackers earn money picking fruit from orchards in the area between November and June.  Many apple trees are being replaced with avocado trees.

Tourism

Donnybrook has many town icons bearing the apple. On the main street, apple-shaped lights line the entrance of the Old Railway Station. These lights have recently been restored. Atop the east Donnybrook hill is a  tower with an apple at the top. The apple is part of The Big Apple Farmstay.(formerly the Big Apple Tourist and Wildlife Park). From the top of the apple, farmstay guests can view Donnybrook and its surrounding areas.

Apple festival

The Donnybrook Apple Festival is held every year during Easter.  During the apple festival, the citizens of Donnybrook gather at Egan Park to celebrate the apple. The festival includes agricultural displays, a sideshow alley, a Saturday evening concert & fireworks display and a street parade. During the street parade the Catholic Church of Donnybrook blesses the holy apple, assuring a good harvest in the years to come.

The Apple Festival also had a mascot, Donny Applebrook, created in 1997. Donny was a giant green apple who promoted the festival.

Apple Fun Park playground

The centre of town is home to the Apple Fun Park outdoor playground, which opened in Easter 2008 in time for the Donnybrook Apple Festival that year. The expansive fruit-themed park contains children's play equipment (including an  tower, swing sets, trampolines, multiple slides and a flying fox), an adult exercise area, as well as a shaded picnic area with public barbecues. At the time of its construction it was the largest free-entry playground in Australia, and it attracts up to 50,000 visitors each year. The playground helped inject over $6 million into the local economy over the first 13 years of its existence, and its success has inspired the construction of similar playgrounds in the region.

In April 2021 the playground was temporarily closed for revitalisation works with much of the play equipment demolished as it had reached the end of its design life. The playground reopened in October 2021 with a larger, updated design, new lighting and expanded shading and greenspaces, and new play equipment and activities (though some original play equipment was also retained).

English Oak
Donnybrook is home to Australia's largest known English Oak. The tree, believed to originate from 1893 is a landmark within the town. There is also a time capsule under this tree.

See also
 Donnybrook stone

References

External links
Shire of Donnybrook-Balingup
Donnybrook Apple Festival

Towns in Western Australia
South West (Western Australia)